"Black Magic" is a song by German DJ and producer Jonasu, released as a single on 18 December 2020 by 3 Beat Records. It was written by Jonasu, RØRY, and Dutch singer Rani who also provides uncredited vocals. Remixes by SHOSH and Tim Croft were released on 26 March and 11 June 2021 respectively. After being used in an episode of British dating game show Love Island in June 2021, the song registered a 59% increase in daily Spotify streams and entered the top 40 of the UK Singles Chart.

Track listing
Digital download and streaming
 "Black Magic" – 2:53

Digital download and streaming – SHOSH remix
 "Black Magic" (SHOSH Remix) – 3:03

Digital download and streaming – Tim Croft remix
 "Black Magic" (Tim Croft Remix) – 2:58

Personnel
Credits adapted from Qobuz.
 Jonasu – production, mixing, programming 
 Rani – vocals
 Fabian Lenssen – mastering

Charts

Weekly charts

Year-end charts

Certifications

References

2020 singles
2020 songs
Jonasu songs
Rani (Dutch singer) songs
Song recordings produced by Jonasu
Songs written by Jonasu
Songs written by Rani (Dutch singer)
Songs written by Roxanne Emery
3 Beat Records singles